Hasrat Jaipuri, born Iqbal Hussain (15 April 1922 – 17 September 1999) was an Indian poet, who wrote in the Hindi and Urdu languages. He was also a renowned film lyricist in Hindi films, where he won the Filmfare Awards for Best Lyricist twice – in 1966 and then in 1972.

Early life
Jaipuri was born Iqbal Husain in Jaipur, where he studied English till medium level, and then acquired his taalim (education) in Urdu and Persian from his maternal grandfather, the poet Fida Husain 'Fida'. He began writing verse, when he was around twenty years old. Around the same time, he fell in love with a neighborhood girl name Radha. Hasrat talked about a love letter he wrote to this girl, in an interview, later in his life, that love knows no religion. Hasrat Jaipuri was quoted as saying, "It is not at all necessary that a Muslim boy must fall in love only with a Muslim girl. My love was silent, but I wrote a poem for her, 'Yeh mera prem patra padh kar, ke tum naaraaz na hona." It is not known for sure whether the love letter was actually delivered to Radha. But veteran film producer Raj Kapoor liked it enough to include it in his Sangam (1964 Hindi film) and the song ended up becoming a 'hit' song in India.

Career in Bollywood
In 1940, Jaipuri came to Bombay (now Mumbai), and  started working as a bus conductor, earning a monthly salary of eleven rupees. He used to participate in mushairas. At a mushaira, Prithviraj Kapoor noticed Jaipuri and recommended him to his son, Raj Kapoor. Raj Kapoor was planning a musical love story, Barsaat (1949) with Shankar–Jaikishan. Jaipuri wrote his first recorded song, Jiya Beqaraar Hai for the film. His second song (and first duet) was Chhor Gaye Baalam.

Along with Shailendra, Jaipuri wrote lyrics for all Raj Kapoor films till 1971. After the death of Jaikishan and failures of Mera Naam Joker (1970) and Kal Aaj Aur Kal (1971), however, Raj Kapoor turned to other lyricists and music directors. Raj Kapoor initially wanted to call him back for Prem Rog (1982), but later settled for another lyricist, Amir Qazalbash. Kapoor finally asked him to write lyrics for the film, Ram Teri Ganga Maili (1985). Later, he also invited Hasrat to write three songs for the movie Henna (1991). Jaipuri alleges that after Raj Kapoor's death, the music composer Ravindra Jain "conspired" to "scrap" his lyrics and replace them with his own lyrics.

When fellow lyricist Shailendra turned producer with Teesri Kasam, he invited Jaipuri to write lyrics for the movie. He also wrote screenplay for the movie Hulchul (1951). His last film as a lyricist was Hatya: The Murder (2004).

Selected list of songs

Poetry
Jaipuri wrote several books of poetry, in Hindi and Urdu. He once said, "Hindi and Urdu are like two great and inseparable sisters."
 Abshaar-E-Ghazal (compilation of Hasrat Jaipuri's poetry)

Personal life
Jaipuri invested his earnings in real estate or rental property, on his wife's advice. Thanks to earnings from these properties, his financial condition was sound, and therefore he could devote his time as a lyricist. He was survived by two sons and a daughter who live in Mumbai. His sister Bilqis Malik was married to music director Sardar Malik and is the mother of composer Anu Malik.

He has two sons & a daughter, Akhtar Hasrat Jaipuri and Asif Hasrat Jaipuri & Kishwar Jaipuri. Aadil, Amaan, Aamir & Faiz Jaipuri are his grandsons.

Awards
 Filmfare Best Lyricist Award - 1972 for Zindagi Ek Safar Hai Suhana (Andaz, (1971)
 Filmfare Best Lyricist Award - 1967 for the song Baharo Phool Barsao [Suraj (1966 film)]
 Josh Malihabadi Award, from Urdu Conference
 Dr. Ambedkar Award, for Jhanak Jhanak Tori Baaje Payaliya [Mere Huzoor (1968)], a Brajbhasha song
 Jaipuri was also awarded a doctorate degree from the World University Round Table.

See also
 Shankar Jaikishan
 Shailendra
 Majrooh Sultanpuri
 Gulzar
 Indeevar
 Javed Akhtar
 Sahir Ludhianvi

References

External links
 
 Ghazals and nazms by Hasrat Jaipuri
 Complete list of works of Hasrat Jaipuri (Hindi)

Indian male songwriters
Urdu-language poets
Hindi-language poets
1922 births
1999 deaths
20th-century Indian Muslims
Writers from Jaipur
Indian lyricists
20th-century Indian poets
20th-century Indian male writers
20th-century male musicians